Yapese is a language spoken by the people on the island of Yap (Federated States of Micronesia). It belongs to the Austronesian languages, more specifically to the Oceanic branch of that family.  It has been difficult to classify it further, but Yapese may prove to be one of the Admiralty Islands languages.

Orthography

Written Yapese uses Latin script. In Yapese spelling as practiced until the 1970s, the glottal stop was not written with an explicit character. A word-final glottal stop was represented by doubling the final vowel letter. Glottalization of consonants was represented with an apostrophe. In the 1970s an orthography was created which uses double vowel letters to represent long vowels; and because of the ambiguity that would occur if the glottal stop was not written, the glottal stop was written with the letter q. This new orthography using the letter q is not in universal use, but many works and maps about Yap write place names using the new q-orthography.

Phonology

Apart from a couple grammatical forms which are V, syllables are CV or CVC.

Consonants

Yapese is one of the relatively few languages in the world with ejective fricatives. There are also glottalised nasals  and approximants .

In the table below, each phoneme is listed to the left of the grapheme that represents it in Yapese orthography.

  and   only occur in English and Japanese loans (  does occur in native words, however).

Vowels

In the table below, each phoneme is listed to the left of the grapheme that represents it in Yapese orthography.

Grammar

Morphology

Reduplication
Yapese makes use of reduplication for several morphological functions, including deriving stative adjectives from inchoative adjectives, as in (1a–b), as well as to make diminutives of verbs, as in (2a-b):

Pronouns
Yapese distinguishes between three numbers (singular, dual, and plural) and three persons (first, second, and third), as well as clusivity in its personal pronouns.

A Yapese Talking Dictionary was produced by Living Tongues Institute for Endangered Languages.

References

Bibliography
Jensen, John Thayer. 1977. Yapese–English Dictionary. (PALI Language Texts: Micronesia.) Honolulu: University of Hawai‘i Press.

External links

 Yapese Wordlist at the Austronesian Basic Vocabulary Database
 Jensen Yapese Dictionary On-Line at www.trussel2.com
 Yapese Talking Dictionary
 Chepin yuu Waqab ('Events on Yap'). Yapese-language vernacular reader
 Yaat nu Waqab ('Tales of Yap'). A Yapese-language vernacular reader
 Thaaboeg (this title is a man's name). A Yapese-language vernacular reader
 Written materials about Yapese plants and animals archived with Kaipuleohone 
 Index cards of plant and animal names, labeled 'Carolines [animals].' and index cards of plant and animal names, labeled 'Carolines [plants].' 
 Paradisec has two collections of Arthur Capell's materials (AC1, AC2), which include Yapese language materials 
 Paradisec has an open access collection of Yapese texts and a dictionary from John Jensen  

Yap
Oceanic languages
Languages of the Federated States of Micronesia